Brendan McGill (born 22 May 1981, in Dublin) is an Irish former footballer who played as a winger.

Career
McGill began his career at Sunderland, for whom he played one game; a 2–1 victory at Luton Town in the League Cup. He then signed for Carlisle United in 2002 and in May 2006, signed for Gretna. On 19 May 2008 McGill was a part of the remaining 40 staff members who were released by Gretna. Conference National side York City had lined up signing McGill, but he chose to return to Ireland and signed for Bohemians. He made his debut as a second-half substitute away to Galway United on 22 August. McGill made his first start away to Sligo Rovers, getting on the scoresheet in the process. After just four months with Bohemians, he returned to Cumbria, signing for Barrow of the Conference National in January 2009. He helped Barrow keep their place in the Conference National but was released at the end of the season, with the club's managers stating that he did not fit into future plans. McGill signed for Drogheda United on 8 July 2009. His first Drogheda goal came in a 4–0 win over Galway United on 21 October 2009.

Following a season and a half at Drogheda United, McGill joined League of Ireland First Division side Shelbourne for their 2011 campaign.

Honours

International

Republic of Ireland
 UEFA European Under-17 Football Championship – 1998

Club

Gretna
 Scottish Football League First Division – 2006–07

Bohemians
 FAI Cup – 2008

References

External links
Brendan McGill's profile at www.shelbournefc.com

1981 births
Living people
Association footballers from Dublin (city)
Republic of Ireland association footballers
Republic of Ireland youth international footballers
Republic of Ireland expatriate association footballers
Association football midfielders
Sunderland A.F.C. players
Carlisle United F.C. players
Gretna F.C. players
Bohemian F.C. players
Barrow A.F.C. players
Drogheda United F.C. players
Shelbourne F.C. players
English Football League players
National League (English football) players
Scottish Premier League players
Scottish Football League players
League of Ireland players
Expatriate footballers in England
Expatriate footballers in Scotland